The 2019–20 Ohio State Buckeyes men's ice hockey season was the 57th season of play for the program and the 7th season in the Big Ten Conference. The Buckeyes represented the Ohio State University and were coached by Steve Rohlik, in his 7th season.

On March 12, 2020, the Big Ten announced that the tournament was cancelled due to the coronavirus pandemic.

Roster

As of September 3, 2019.

Standings

Schedule and Results

|-
!colspan=12 style=";" | Exhibition

|-
!colspan=12 style=";" | 

|-
!colspan=12 style=";" | Regular Season

|-
!colspan=12 style=";" | 

|-
!colspan=12 style=";" | 

|- align="center" bgcolor="#e0e0e0"
|colspan=12|Remainder of Tournament Cancelled

Scoring Statistics

Goaltending statistics

Rankings

Players drafted into the NHL

2020 NHL Entry Draft

† incoming freshman

References

External links

Ohio State Buckeyes men's ice hockey seasons
Ohio State Buckeyes
Ohio State Buckeyes
Ohio State Buckeyes
Ohio State Buckeyes